Harris Deller is an American ceramist. He is well known for his black and white incised porcelain.

Biography
Harris Deller was born in Brooklyn, NY in 1947.  He received his BA from California State University, Northridge and his MFA from the Cranbrook Academy of Art in 1973 studying with Richard DeVore. 
Deller's work has been shown in 100+ group exhibitions, featured in 15+ solo exhibits in museums and galleries, represented in 25+ major collections, and pictures or cited in 40+ publications. He has received Artists Fellowships from the Illinois Arts Council, Arts Midwest, a regional NEA, and a Fulbright Fellowship to South Korea in 1980/81. Professor Deller was elected a Fellow to the National Council for Education in the Ceramic Arts in 1992 and was awarded membership into the International Academy of Ceramics in 2011.

Harris taught at Southern Illinois University in Carbondale, Illinois from 1975-2013. In 2008, he received the NCECA Excellence in Teaching Award for his outstanding contributions to education in the field of ceramics. He continues producing his work at White Roof Studio in Carbondale, Illinois.

Collections
Deller's ceramic works are represented in the following collections:

Museum of Contemporary Art and Design, New York
Illinois State Museum, Chicago and Springfield, IL
Hallmark Art Collection, Kansas City
Shigaraki Museum of Contemporary Ceramic Art, Japan
Everson Museum of Art, Syracuse, New York
San Angelo Museum of Fine Arts, Texas
Crocker Art Museum, Sacramento
De Young Museum of Fine Arts, San Francisco.

Students
Some of his students include:
Yih-Wen Kuo (1981), Elaine Olafson Henry (1995), Colby Parsons (1998), Veronica L. Watkins (2000), Lou Pierozzi (2001) Brenda Quinn (2003), Greg Cochenet (2004), Bethany Benson (2007), KyoungHwa Oh (2008), Amy Chase (2010), Nick Toebaas (2011), Noel Bailey (2012),  and CJ Niehaus (2013)

See also 
 American craft
 Ceramics (art)
 Studio pottery

References

Further reading 
 7 Ceramistes Nord-americans deI’AIC, Revista Ceramica Contemporania terr art, ACC Barcelona, 2013.
 Merino, Anthony. Art, Objecthood and Clay – Harris Deller, Ceramics Art and Perception, 88, 2012 
 Brown, Glen. 500 Sculptures: Contemporary Practice, Singular Works Lark Books, 2009.
 Brown, Glen. Harris Deller: Made in China Ceramics Monthly, January 2008.
 Brown, Glen. Harris Deller: The Depth of Black and White. Ceramic Art and Perception, 66, 2006.
 Tourtillot, Suzanne. 500 Cups, Lark Books, 2005.
 In the Land of Lincoln: 20 Illinois Potters, The Studio Potter, June 2003.
 Gardner, Nancy. Harris Deller, American Ceramics, 1989.
 Lane, P. Porcelain, Chilton Book, 1980.

External links 
Harris Deller web site

1947 births
American ceramists
American potters
20th-century ceramists
20th-century American sculptors
American male sculptors
Modern sculptors
Sculptors from Illinois
Cranbrook Academy of Art alumni
Living people
20th-century American male artists